Mayumi "Mimi" Roller (born March 11, 1991) is an actress from the United States Virgin Islands.

She also represented the USVI in the 2012 Summer Olympics in London, England in the women's Laser Radial class.

Among many other regattas, Mayumi also competed in the Kieler Woche 2014 together with the sailor Kayla McComb-Raab as Team MK Sailing in the boat class 49erFX.

Mayumi grew up on an organic farm (Coral Bay Organic Gardens - Josephine's Greens) on the island of St. John, where her older brother, Hugo Roller, inspired her to start sailing.

Mayumi attended St. Mary's College of Maryland, where she was an NCAA All-American athlete, and contributed to numerous podium finishes at various National Championships throughout her time at St. Mary's.

Her acting career began in 2017 when she acted in a Travel Channel commercial followed by a series of commercials for the U.S. Virgin Islands Department of Tourism. Since then she has acted in a number of commercials, films, and TV shows, most notably The Resident, starring Matt Czuchry, Emily VanCamp, Manish Dayal, Bruce Greenwood, and Malcolm-Jamal Warner. She also portrays Cole Hauser's wife, Deelie Boyd, in the thriller Muti, starring Morgan Freeman.

Filmography

References

External links
 
 
 
 

1991 births
Living people
United States Virgin Islands female sailors (sport)
Olympic sailors of the United States Virgin Islands
Sailors at the 2012 Summer Olympics – Laser Radial
Pan American Games competitors for the United States Virgin Islands
Sailors at the 2015 Pan American Games
Sailors at the 2019 Pan American Games
St. Mary's Seahawks sailors